Colasposoma velutinum is a species of leaf beetle of Mali, and Senegal, described by Édouard Lefèvre in 1885.

References

velutinum
Beetles of Africa
Taxa named by Édouard Lefèvre
Beetles described in 1885
Insects of West Africa